Ziad Fahd is a Free Syrian Army brigadier general, who defected from the Syrian Army to the FSA on March 28, 2012. He currently holds the position of deputy chief of staff in the Southern Front. He is also a former member of the General Command of the Joint Command Council and former head of the Damascus Military Council. He has attempted to bolster more moderate
forces in the South through outreach to Jordan.

References 

Living people
Year of birth missing (living people)
Syrian generals
Defectors to the Free Syrian Army